Roller Girl is a young adult graphic novel written and illustrated by Victoria Jamieson, published by Dial Books for Young Readers in 2015. It is set in contemporary Portland, Oregon and details how the hero, Astrid, becomes a roller derby skater. It was named a Newbery Honor book in 2016.

Plot summary
Astrid's mother takes her and her best friend, Nicole, on numerous "Evenings of Cultural Enrichment" which often confuse, bore, or inappropriately amuse the two girls; one night in fifth grade, they attend a roller derby match between the Oregon City Rollergirls and the Rose City Rollers. Astrid asks her mother's permission to attend the Rollers' Junior Roller Derby Camp that summer, assuming that Nicole will also join with her. Instead, Nicole chooses to attend dance camp with Astrid's longtime rival Rachel.

At camp, Astrid wonders if she can still be friends with Nicole; she later makes friends with Zoey, but struggles with her skating skills and jealousy over making the team.

Development
Jamieson attended her first roller derby match in 2008 and began to be involved with the Rollers after moving to Portland with her husband in 2009, eventually joining under the derby nickname 'Winnie the Pow'.

Reception
In 2016, the American Library Association named Roller Girl to its list of Newbery Honor winners, alongside Kimberly Brubaker Bradley's The War That Saved My Life and Pam Muñoz Ryan's Echo. It won the 2018 Young Hoosier Book Award (Intermediate) and was named to the 2016 Bank Street Children's Best Books of the Year List.

References

External links
 
American graphic novels
American young adult novels
Newbery Honor-winning works